"Burnt Sienna" is a song from New Zealand singer Margaret Urlich. The song was released in May 1993 as the fourth and final single from her second studio album, Chameleon Dreams. The song peaked at number 33 on the Australian singles chart.

At the ARIA Music Awards of 1994. Urlich was nominated for ARIA Award for Best Female Artist for "Burnt Sienna", but lost to "Friday's Child" by Wendy Matthews.

Track listing 
CD single/7" (Columbia 659003.1)
 "Burnt Sienna"
 "Guilty People" (live)
 "Burnt Sienna" (live)

Charts

References

External links 
 "Burnt Sienna" at Discogs

1992 songs
1993 singles
Margaret Urlich songs
Columbia Records singles